Sandoyartunnilin (Sandoy Tunnel) is an undersea road tunnel under construction in the Faroe Islands. It will connect the main island of Streymoy with Sandoy to the south. The length of the tunnel will be 10.8 kilometres. The estimated cost is 860 million DKK. The tunnel is expected to be ready for traffic in late 2023, after which the ferry Teistin will cease its route between Gamlarætt on Streymoy and Skopun on Sandoy. The tunnel crosses the Skopunarfjørður and runs from Gamlarætt to Traðardalur in central Sandoy, near the Inni í Dal stadium.

On 3 February 2022 the two sides of the tunnel were connected during a ceremony. Construction began on 27 June 2019 and the halfway mark was hit in September 2020. It will take until the end of 2022 before the tunnel can open for traffic and the ferry route to Sandoy will cease to operate.

In political, legal and economic terms, the project is linked to the Eysturoyartunnilin, which was opened for traffic on 19 December 2020. The Eysturoyartunnilin, expected to be more lucrative than the Sandoyartunnilin, will partially finance the latter via cross subsidisation. It is projected that 300-400 vehicles per day will use the tunnel to Sandoy. In comparison, the average daily ridership of the ferry route was 195 vehicles (with drivers) and 613 passengers (excluding drivers) in 2021. The ridership of the Sandoyartunnilin would be further increased if it can act as a stepping stone for the Suðuroyartunnilin, or new ferry route, to Suðuroy.

A new residential and industrial area is being built with tunnel debris at Velbastaður. Other debris is used in Runavík and Strendur for a new coastal road.

The Farose Útoyggjafelagið ('Outpost Island Society) lobbied for a branch to the island of Hestur, but this was deprioritised due to costs. Ferry port Gamlarætt will therefore remain a ferry port for Hestur after the Sandoy route terminates.

Route

See also
 List of tunnels of the Faroe Islands

References

Road tunnels
Tunnels in the Faroe Islands
Undersea tunnels in Europe